Glyphipterix similis is a species of sedge moth in the genus Glyphipterix. It was described by Alfred Philpott in 1928. It is found in New Zealand.

References

Moths described in 1928
Glyphipterigidae
Moths of New Zealand